This is a list of minority attorneys general in the United States. In the United States, an ethnic minority is anyone who has at least one parent who is not of non-Hispanic white descent (such as African Americans, Asian Americans, Pacific Islands Americans, Hispanic and Latino Americans, or Native Americans). Ethnic minorities currently constitute around 38% of the total population.

List of ethnic-minority attorneys general

Italics denotes acting Attorney-General
†  Died in office

See also
 Governor (United States)
 List of current United States governors
 List of U.S. state governors born outside the United States
 List of minority governors and lieutenant governors in the United States

References

External links
  Rutgers Program on the Governor

 
 
 
Attorn